Edgewood High School is a secondary school located in West Covina, California and is serviced by West Covina Unified School District. Previously a high school and now once again one, it shares its campus with Edgewood Middle School. The newly started high school's first graduating class was the class of 2014, which was the only class on campus when the school first opened in 2010.

History 
Edgewood High School was originally established in 1958 by the Covina Union High School District after they bought land from the Hurst Family Ranch. The purpose of the school was to ease the problems of overcrowding at West Covina High School's old campus.

Demographics
The ethnicity of the school in 2021-2022 was:
Hispanic/Latino: 632
Asian: 156
White: 29
African American: 15
American Indian/Alaska Native: 2
Pacific Islander: 6
Two or more races: 3
Not reported: 12
Total: 855

Notable alumni

Rick Aguilera, baseball player for the New York Mets, Minnesota Twins, Boston Red Sox and Chicago Cubs
Mike Powell, track and field athlete, holder of the long jump world record
Gary Roenicke, baseball player for the Montreal Expos, Baltimore Orioles and New York Yankees
 Ron Roenicke, MLB player and coach, former Milwaukee Brewers manager
 Jeff Cook, basketball player for the Phoenix Suns, San Antonio Spurs, Cleveland Cavaliers, and Utah Jazz.
Jim Merritt, baseball player for the Minnesota Twins, Cincinnati Reds, Texas Rangers, World Series 1965 and 1970
Jay Johnstone, baseball player for the California Angels, Chicago White Sox, Oakland Athletics, Philadelphia Phillies, New York Yankees, San Diego Padres, Los Angeles Dodgers and Chicago Cubs
Jim Maceda, Class of 1966, is a journalist and foreign correspondent for NBC News based in London

Yearly API

References

External links 
 West Covina Unified School District website
 School home page

Educational institutions in the United States with year of establishment missing
High schools in Los Angeles County, California
Public high schools in California
1956 establishments in California